30 Silver Pieces is the first studio album by Salt Lake City, Utah-based band Melodramus.

The album is currently available as a free download with option to name your own price.

Track listing
Source: Amazon, CD Baby

Personnel

Zakkary Hale - Guitars/Lead Vocals 
Mikey Collard - Bass Guitar 
Andrew Hopkins - Percussion 
Ted Newsom aka The Rose Phantom - Keyboards/Backing vocals

Additional Personnel
Matty Jones - Guest vocals on tracks 3 & 14 
Breanna White - Guest vocals on tracks 4 & 12
Produced by Melodramus 
Co-produced by Bruce "Brewski" Kirby 
Engineered, mixed, and mastered by Bruce Kirby

References

External links
Melodramus Official Site
Melodramus on Facebook

Melodramus albums
2007 albums
Self-released albums